The BAFTA Interactive Awards and BAFTA Games Awards were created in 2003 by splitting the original BAFTA Interactive Entertainment Awards into two separate ceremonies.

While the previous ceremonies had been annually hosted each October since 1998, the 2003 Interactive Awards weren't held until 19 February of the following year, while the 2004 event took place on 2 March 2005.

In March 2006, BAFTA issued a press release announcing that "Video Games are as Important as Film and Television", and reinstated the Games Awards to the traditional October slot. No mention of Interactive Awards was made, and all traces of the ceremony vanished shortly afterwards when BAFTA's website was reorganised, making it the shortest running event in BAFTA's history.

Children's Learning
2004 : Headline History
2003 : (not awarded)

Design
2004 : Alexander McQueen Website
2003 : Greenwich Millennium Village

DVD
2004 : The Chaplin Collection
2003 : Lion King - Special Edition DVD

Factual 
2004 : Stagework
2003 : (two awards - Online & Offline)

Film/TV website
2004 : Trauma
2003 : Starfinder

Interactive Arts
2004 : Frequency and Volume
2003 : Alleph.net

Interactive Arts Installation 
2004 : (not awarded)
2003 : The House of Osama Bin Laden

Interactive TV
2004 : Spooks Interactive
2003 :	V:MX

Music
2004 : SSEYO miniMIXA
2003 : (not awarded)

New Talent Award
2004 : Dan Jones
2003 : (not awarded)

News & Sport
2004 : England's Exit From Euro 2004
2003 : (not awarded)

Offline Factual
2004 : (single Factual award)
2003 : DNA Interactive DVD

Offline Learning
2004 : (combined with Online Learning)
2003 : Knowledge Box

Online Entertainment
2004 : Hitchhiker's Guide to the Galaxy Adventure Game - 20th Anniversary Edition
2003 : Celebdaq

Online Factual
2004 : (single Factual award)
2003 : Tate Online

Online Learning
2004 : Stagework
2003 : Bodysong

Technical Innovation
2004 : Careers Wales Online
2003 : The Darkhouse

References

External links
Headline History
Alexander McQueen

Interactive
Interactive
Internet in the United Kingdom
Awards established in 2003
BAFTA Interactive Awards